Portobello Toddler Hut is an early pioneer nursery school in Portobello, Edinburgh, Scotland, founded in 1929, and opened on Saturday, 14 November 1931 by Harriet, Lady Findlay, on "an appallingly wet day". When opened it catered for 40 children from 2 to 5 years of age. Starting at 10am, the older children returned home at midday and the younger ones stayed and had a meal and an afternoon sleep.  It was run by a committee of ladies on a voluntary basis. The Education Committee of Edinburgh gave a grant to cover about a third of the costs, with the remaining money subscribed "so that bread-winning mothers may be relieved of the care of their children during the busy part of the day". Montessori methods were used to prepare the toddlers for more formal education. As well as a nursery the Hut was used for many years as a shelter for children lost on the beach during the summer holidays. The Toddler Hut is still operating in Beach Lane Portobello, the oldest community run, self funded childcare facility in the UK. During the COVID-19 crisis, the Hut was saved from closure thanks to a fundraising campaign.

References 

Montessori education
Preschools
Schools in Edinburgh
Portobello, Edinburgh